Tolmezzo (archaic  or Schönfeld) is a town and comune in the province of Udine, part of the autonomous Friuli Venezia Giulia region of north-eastern Italy.

Geography
Tolmezzo is located at the foot of the Strabut Mountain, between the Tagliamento River and the Bût stream. Nearby is the Mount Amariana, elevation . The commune also includes the five frazioni of Cadunea (Friulian: Cjadugnee), Caneva (Cjanive), Casanova (Cjasegnove), Fusea (Fusee), Illegio (Dieç), Imponzo (Dimponç).

History

The existence of Tolmezzo (called Tolmetium) is first documented in the late 10th century, when it was part of the Patriarchate of Aquileia, but it has been suggested that the town stemmed from a very ancient pre-Roman settlement. In  Roman times, the area was crossed by one of the main Roman roads that connected Italy to what is now Austria.

The city had a flourishing market, and was defended by a line of walls with 18 towers and by the castle of the Patriarchs. In 1420, it was annexed to the Republic of Venice, but its trades and industries did not suffer from the change, and the city maintained its privileges. In 1797, with the Treaty of Campo Formio, it was handed over to the Austrian Empire, and, after a short Napoleonic rule, it was included in the client Kingdom of Lombardy–Venetia.

Tolmezzo became part of the new unified Kingdom of Italy in 1866.

Main sights
The Duomo (cathedral)
Palazzo Campeis (late 18th century): Museum

References

External links
  (Map of Tolmezzo region).

Cities and towns in Friuli-Venezia Giulia